Christchurch Rowing Club is a rowing club on the River Stour, based at River Bank, Wick Lane, Christchurch, Dorset and is affiliated to British Rowing.

History
The club was founded in 1948 before the boathouse moved to the current location in the mid 1960s with an extension being added in 2008. The club is also affiliated to the Hants and Dorset Amateur Rowing Association which governs coastal rowing.

The club has produced multiple British champions.

Honours

British champions

References

Sport in Dorset
Rowing clubs in England
Christchurch, Dorset